Pengkalan Rinting was a state constituency in Johor, Malaysia, that has been represented in the Johor State Legislative Assembly since 2004 until 2013.

The state constituency was created in the 2003 redistribution and is mandated to return a single member to the Johor State Legislative Assembly under the first past the post voting system.

History
2004–2016: The constituency contains the polling districts of Jaya Mas, Belibis Perling, Sri Jaya, Kampong Pasir, Pengkalan Rinting, Skudai Kiri, Sungai Danga, Taman Sutera, Bukit Serene, Ulu Ayer Molek, Kebun Teh, Tarom, Nong Chik, Tambatan, Gertak Merah, Kampong Bahru, Yahya Awal, Ngee Heng, Ayer Molek, Kampong Pahang, Bandar, Camar Perling, Pucung Perling, Rawa Perling, Bukit Indah, Nusa Indah, Selesa Jaya, Tampoi Indah.

2016–present: The constituency contains the polling districts of Jaya Mas, Belibis Perling, Sri Jaya, Kampong Pasir, Pengkalan Rinting, Skudai Kiri, Sungai Danga, Taman Sutera, Bukit Serene, Ulu Ayer Molek, Kebun Teh, Tarom, Nong Chik, Tambatan, Gertak Merah, Kampong Bahru, Yahya Awal, Ngee Heng, Ayer Molek, Kampong Pahang, Bandar, Camar Perling, Pekaka Perling, Rawa Perling, Bukit Indah, Nusa Indah, Selesa Jaya, Tampoi Indah, Simbang Perling, Uda Bestari, Sri Sinding.

Representation history

Election results

References

Defunct Johor state constituencies